Oil down is a salted meat and vegetable stew that is the national dish of Grenada.

Description
Oil down is a stew of breadfruit, salted meat, chicken, dumplings, callaloo, and other vegetables stewed in coconut milk, herbs, and spices. The name refers to the fact that the oil from the coconut milk used in cooking is either absorbed by the ingredients or settles to the bottom of the cooking pot. All of the liquid is cooked down (dried out), hence the name oil down.

The term "oil down" is also used for a traditional neighborhood party at which the stew is prepared and eaten. Traditionally it is the men who cook the oil down at such parties. Oil down is also very popular in local restaurants.

There is no set recipe for oil down, as each household and each parish makes it to suit their preference.

Oil down is not unique to Grenada. It is also popular in nearby Trinidad and Tobago, which shares a long history of cultural influences with Grenada. There are differences in how each island makes its oil down, however, with Grenadians preferring dasheen, dumplings, and turmeric while Trinidadians tend toward a simpler dish without dumplings, but with hot peppers. There are different versions of this stew in other Caribbean countries as well. In Guyana a similar stew is called mettagee, or mettem, and in Jamaica there is a seafood version called run down.

See also
 Culture of Grenada
 List of stews
 Stew peas – a similar Jamaican stew

References

Further reading
West Indian kitchen gardens: A historical perspective with current insights from Grenada (United Nations University website)
The Secrets of the Caribbean Cuisine - Facts & Reviews (WPB Magazine)
12 Grenadian Foods Every Island Transplant Should Try (Caribbean Life | St. George's University)
Grenada Today On-line Archived Web Site (Grenada Today, Ltd., Grenada, 2001)
Top 10 foods to try in the Caribbean (BBC Good Food)
West Indian Cuisine and recipes

Grenadian cuisine
Stews
Foods containing coconut
National dishes